Max Messner was a professional American football player who played linebacker for six seasons for the Pittsburgh Steelers, Detroit Lions, and New York Giants

References

1938 births
1996 deaths
American football linebackers
New York Giants players
Pittsburgh Steelers players
Detroit Lions players
Cincinnati Bearcats football players
People from Ashland, Ohio